is the first single by the Japanese pop girl group Berryz Kobo. It was released on March 3, 2004.

The single ranked 18th in the Oricon Weekly Singles Chart.

Track listing
 "Anata Nashi de wa Ikite Yukenai" (Music and lyrics: Tsunku. Arrangement: Akira)
 "Berry Fields" (Music and lyrics: Tsunku. Arrangement: Morio Takashi)
 "Anata Nashi de wa Ikite Yukenai" (Instrumental)

PV versions
 Normal version
 Dance-shot version
 Close-up version (group)

References 

2004 singles
Songs written by Tsunku
Berryz Kobo songs
Song recordings produced by Tsunku
2004 songs
Piccolo Town singles